Flight 530 may refer to:

British European Airways Flight 530, crashed on 7 August 1946
SATA Air Açores Flight 530M, crashed on 11 December 1999

0530